Toronto Titans is one of the two new teams for the professional International Swimming League 2020 season, announced in December 2019, taking the total number of teams in the league to ten. Toronto Titans is based in Toronto, Ontario and trains out of the Toronto Pan Am Sports Centre in Scarborough.

2020 International Swimming League season

Team roster

During the spring of 2020 Toronto Titans announced various signees to their roster for the planned 2020 ISL season, including Kylie Masse, Kayla Sanchez, Michael Chadwick, Blake Pieroni and Icelander, Anton McKee. Masse, a six-time gold medalist, four-time silver medalist and four-time bronze medalist is the captain for the team, while Brent Hayden, a four-time gold medalist, seven-time silver medalist and 11-time bronze medalist is the vice-captain.

Match results

References 

2020 establishments in Ontario
International Swimming League
Sports clubs established in 2020
Sports teams in Toronto
Swim teams in Canada